Male infertility refers to a sexually mature male's inability to impregnate a fertile female. In humans it accounts for 40–50% of infertility. It affects approximately 7% of all men. Male infertility is commonly due to deficiencies in the semen, and semen quality is used as a surrogate measure of male fecundity. More recently, advance sperm analyses that examine intracellular sperm components are being developed.

Age considerations
There is a decrease in sperm concentration as men age: 90% of seminiferous tubules in men in their 20s and 30s contain spermatids, whereas men in their 40s and 50s have spermatids in 50% of their seminiferous tubules, and only 10% of seminiferous tubules from men aged > 80 years contain spermatids. In a random international sample of 11,548 men confirmed to be biological fathers by DNA paternity testing, the oldest father was found to be 66 years old at the birth of his child; the ratio of DNA-confirmed versus DNA-rejected paternity tests around that age is in agreement with the notion of general male infertility above age 65–66.

Causes
Factors relating to male infertility include:

Immune infertility 
Antisperm antibodies (ASA) have been considered as infertility cause in around 10–30% of infertile couples.  ASA production are directed against surface antigens on sperm, which can interfere with sperm motility and transport through the female reproductive tract, inhibiting capacitation and acrosome reaction, impaired fertilization, influence on the implantation process, and impaired growth and development of the embryo. Risk factors for the formation of antisperm antibodies in men include the breakdown of the blood‑testis barrier, trauma and surgery, orchitis, varicocele, infections, prostatitis, testicular cancer, failure of immunosuppression and unprotected receptive anal or oral sex with men.

Genetics
Chromosomal anomalies and genetic mutations account for nearly 10–15% of all male infertility cases.

Klinefelter syndrome
One of the most commonly known causes of infertility is Klinefelter syndrome, which affects  one in 500–1000 newborn males. Klinefelter syndrome is a chromosomal defect that occurs during gamete formation due to a non-disjunction error during cell division. Resulting in males having smaller testes, reducing the amount of testosterone and sperm production. Males with this syndrome carry an extra X chromosome (XXY), meaning they have 47 chromosomes compared to the normal 46 in each cell. This extra chromosome directly affects sexual development before birth and during puberty. A variation of Klinefelter syndrome is when some cells in an individual have the extra X chromosome but others do not, referred to as mosaic Klinefelter syndrome. The reduction of testosterone in the male body normally results in an overall decrease in the production of viable sperm for these individuals thereby forcing them to turn to fertility treatments to father children.

Y chromosome deletions
Y chromosomal infertility is a direct cause of male infertility due to its effects on sperm production, occurring in approximately one in 2000 males. Usually, affected men show no symptoms, although they may have smaller testes. Men with this condition may exhibit azoospermia (no sperm production), oligozoospermia (small number of sperm production), or they may produce abnormally shaped sperm (teratozoospermia). This case of infertility occurs during the development of gametes in the male. Where a normal healthy male will have both an X and a Y chromosome, affected males have genetic deletions in the Y chromosome. These deletions affect protein production that is vital for spermatogenesis. Studies have shown that this is an inherited trait; if a male is fathered by a man who also exhibited Y chromosome deletions then this trait will be passed down. These individuals are thereby "Y-linked". Daughters are not affected and cannot be carriers due to their lack of a Y chromosome.

Other 
 Age group 12–49 (Paternal age effect)
 Aneuploidy, an abnormal number of chromosomes 
 Centriole
 Neoplasm, e.g. seminoma
 Idiopathic failure
 Cryptorchidism
 Trauma
 Hydrocele, particularly hydrocele testis
 Hypopituitarism in adults, and hypopituitarism untreated in children (resulting in growth hormone deficiency and proportionate dwarfism.)
 Mumps
 Malaria
 Testicular cancer
 Defects in USP26 in some cases
 Acrosomal defects affecting egg penetration
 Idiopathic oligospermia – unexplained sperm deficiencies account for 30% of male infertility.

Pre-testicular causes
Pre-testicular factors refer to conditions that impede adequate support of the testes and include situations of poor hormonal support and poor general health including:

Varicocele 
Varicocele is a condition of swollen testicle veins.

It is present in 15% of normal men and in about 40% of infertile men.

It is present in up to 35% of cases of primary infertility and 69–81% of secondary infertility.
 Hypogonadotropic hypogonadism due to various causes
 Obesity increases the risk of hypogonadotropic hypogonadism. Animal models indicate that obesity causes leptin insensitivity in the hypothalamus, leading to decreased Kiss1 expression, which, in turn, alters the release of gonadotropin-releasing hormone (GnRH).
 Undiagnosed and untreated coeliac disease (CD). Coeliac men may have reversible infertility. Nevertheless, CD can present with several non-gastrointestinal symptoms that can involve nearly any organ system, even in the absence of gastrointestinal symptoms. Thus, the diagnosis may be missed, leading to a risk of long-term complications. In men, CD can reduce semen quality and cause immature secondary sex characteristics, hypogonadism and hyperprolactinaemia, which causes impotence and loss of libido. The giving of gluten free diet and correction of deficient dietary elements can lead to a return of fertility.  It is likely that an effective evaluation for infertility would best include assessment for underlying celiac disease, both in men and women.
 Drugs, alcohol
 Strenuous riding (bicycle riding, horseback riding)
 Medications, including those that affect spermatogenesis such as chemotherapy, fluoxetine, anabolic steroids, cimetidine, spironolactone; those that decrease FSH levels such as phenytoin; those that decrease sperm motility such as sulfasalazine and nitrofurantoin
 Genetic abnormalities such as a Robertsonian translocation

Tobacco smoking

There is increasing evidence that the harmful products of tobacco smoking may damage the testicles and kill sperm, but their effect on male fertility is not clear. Some governments require manufacturers to put warnings on packets. Smoking tobacco increases intake of cadmium, because the tobacco plant absorbs the metal. Cadmium, being chemically similar to zinc, may replace zinc in the DNA polymerase, which plays a critical role in sperm production. Zinc replaced by cadmium in DNA polymerase can be particularly damaging to the testes.

DNA damage
Common inherited variants in genes that encode enzymes employed in DNA mismatch repair are associated with increased risk of sperm DNA damage and male infertility.   As men age there is a consistent decline in semen quality, and this decline appears to be due to DNA damage. The damage manifests by DNA fragmentation and by the increased susceptibility to denaturation upon exposure to heat or acid, the features characteristic of apoptosis of somatic cells. These findings suggest that DNA damage is an important factor in male infertility.

Epigenetic

An increasing amount of recent evidence has been recorded documenting abnormal sperm DNA methylation in association with abnormal semen parameters and male infertility. Until recently, scientists have thought that epigenetic markers only affect the individual and are not passed down due to not changing the DNA. New studies suggest that environmental factors that changed an individual's epigenetic markers can be seen in their grandchildren, one such study demonstrating this through rats and fertility disruptors. Another study bred rats exposed to an endocrine disruptor, observing effects up to generation F5 including decreased sperm motility and decreased sperm count. These studies suggest that environmental factors that influence fertility can be felt for generations even without changing the DNA.

Post-testicular causes
Post-testicular factors decrease male fertility due to conditions that affect the male genital system after testicular sperm production and include defects of the genital tract as well as problems in ejaculation:
 Vas deferens obstruction
 Lack of Vas deferens, often related to genetic markers for cystic fibrosis
 Infection, e.g. prostatitis, male accessory gland infection
 Retrograde ejaculation
 Ejaculatory duct obstruction
 Hypospadias
 Impotence

Diagnostic evaluations
The diagnosis of infertility begins with a medical history and physical exam by a physician, physician assistant, or nurse practitioner. Typically two separate semen analyses will be required. The provider may order blood tests to look for hormone imbalances, medical conditions, or genetic issues.

Medical history
The history should include prior testicular or penile insults (torsion, cryptorchidism, trauma), infections (mumps orchitis, epididymitis), environmental factors, excessive heat, radiation, medications, and drug use (anabolic steroids, selective serotonin reuptake inhibitors, alcohol, smoking). Sexual habits, frequency and timing of intercourse, use of lubricants, and each partner's previous fertility experiences are important. Loss of libido and headaches or visual disturbances may indicate a pituitary tumor.

The past medical or surgical history may reveal thyroid or liver disease (abnormalities of spermatogenesis), diabetic neuropathy (retrograde ejaculation), radical pelvic or retroperitoneal surgery (absent seminal emission secondary to sympathetic nerve injury), or hernia repair (damage to the vas deferens or testicular blood supply).

A family history may reveal genetic problems.

Physical examination
Usually, the patient disrobes completely and puts on a gown. The physician, physician assistant, or nurse practitioner will perform a thorough examination of the penis, scrotum, testicles, I vas deferens, spermatic cords, ejaculatory ducts, urethra, urinary bladder, anus and rectum. An orchidometer can measure testicular volume, which in turn is tightly associated with both sperm and hormonal parameters. A physical exam of the scrotum can reveal a varicocele, but the impact of detecting and surgically correct a varicocele on sperm parameters or overall male fertility is debated.

Sperm sample

Semen sample obtaining 
Semen sample obtaining is the first step in spermiogram. The optimal sexual abstinence for semen sample obtaining is of 2–7 days. The first way to obtain the semen sample is through masturbation, and the best place to obtain it is in the same clinic, as this way temperature changes during transport can be avoided, which can be lethal for some spermatozoa.

A single semen sample is not determining for disease diagnosis, so two different samples have to be analyzed with an interval between them of seven days to three months, as sperm production is a cyclic process. It is prudent to ask about possible sample loss, as that could mask true results of spermiogram.

To obtain the sample, a sterile plastic recipient is put directly inside, always no more than one hour before being studied. Conventional preservatives shouldn't be used, as they have chemical substances as lubricants or spermicides that could damage the sample. If preservatives have to be used, for cases of religious ethics in which masturbation is forbidden, a preservative with holes is used. In case of paraplegia it is possible to use mechanic tools or electroejaculation.

The sample should never be obtained through coitus interruptus for several reasons:
 Some part of ejaculation could be lost.
 Bacterial contamination could happen.
 The acid vaginal pH could be deleterious for sperm motility.

Also is very important to label the sample correctly the recipient with patient identification, date, hour, abstinence days, among other data required to be known.

The volume of the semen sample (must be more than 1.5 ml), approximate number of total sperm cells, sperm motility/forward progression, and % of sperm with normal morphology are measured. It is possible to have hyperspermia (high volume more than 6 ml) or Hypospermia (low volume less than 0.5 ml). This is the most common type of fertility testing.
Semen deficiencies are often labeled as follows:
 Oligospermia or oligozoospermia – decreased number of spermatozoa in semen
 Aspermia – complete lack of semen
 Hypospermia – reduced seminal volume
 Azoospermia – absence of sperm cells in semen
 Teratospermia – increase in sperm with abnormal morphology
 Asthenozoospermia – reduced sperm motility
 Necrozoospermia – all sperm in the ejaculate are dead
 Leucospermia – a high level of white blood cells in semen
 Normozoospermia or normospermia – It is a result of semen analysis that shows normal values of all ejaculate parameters by WHO but still there are chances of being infertile. This is also called as unexplained Infertility
There are various combinations of these as well, e.g. Teratoasthenozoospermia, which is reduced sperm morphology and motility.
Low sperm counts are often associated with decreased sperm motility and increased abnormal morphology, thus the terms "oligoasthenoteratozoospermia" or "oligospermia" can be used as a catch-all.

Special obtaining 
 Psychological inhibition
– Psychotherapy

– Intercourses with special preservatives without lubricants or spermicides. In case of religion limitations we should use a SCD, or Seminal Collection Device, such as preservatives with holes.

– Drug stimulation

– Percutaneous spermatozoa obtaining directly from epididymis, testes, etc.
 Neurological injury

– Vibro-stimulation

– Electro-stimulation
 Retrograde ejaculation
This type of ejaculation happens when there is a defect on prostate, so the sample is not ejaculated outside but to the bladder. So, in that case, what we have to do to obtain the sample is:

– Intake bicarbonate, about 25 grams, the night before and the morning of the sample obtaining. This will neutralize acidic urine and will turn it alkaline, near semen's pH, so spermatozoa can survive.

– Before masturbation we have to urinate to empty the bladder. This must go to the first recipient.

– Just after that, the subject has to masturbate and ejaculate, obtaining then a new urine sample with ejaculation that will be stored on the second recipient.

– Finally we have to obtain the next urine, 2nd urine, for potential ejaculation fraction, which will be stored in the third recipient. This may contain the most important fraction.

Blood sample

Common hormonal test include determination of FSH and testosterone levels. A blood sample can reveal genetic causes of infertility, e.g. Klinefelter syndrome, a Y chromosome microdeletion, or cystic fibrosis.

Ultrasonography
Scrotal ultrasonography is useful when there is a suspicion of some particular diseases. It may detect signs of testicular dysgenesis, which is often related to an impaired spermatogenesis and to a higher risk of testicular cancer. Scrotum ultrasonography may also detect testicular lesions suggestive of malignancy. A decreased testicular vascularization is characteristic of testicular torsion, whereas hyperemia is often observed in epididymo-orchitis or in some malignant conditions such as lymphoma and leukemia. Doppler ultrasonography useful in assessing venous reflux in case of a varicocele, when palpation is unreliable or in detecting recurrence or persistence after surgery, although the impact of its detection and surgical correction on sperm parameters and overall fertility is debated.

Dilation of the head or tail of the epididymis is suggestive of obstruction or inflammation of the male reproductive tract. Such abnormalities are associated with abnormalities in sperm parameters, as are abnormalities in the texture of the epididymis. Scrotal and transrectal ultrasonography (TRUS) are useful in detecting uni- or bilateral congenital absence of the vas deferens (CBAVD), which may be associated with abnormalities or agenesis of the epididymis, seminal vesicles or kidneys, and indicate the need for testicular sperm extraction. TRUS plays a key role in assessing azoospermia caused by obstruction, and detecting distal CBAVD or anomalies related to obstruction of the ejaculatory duct, such as abnormalities within the duct itself, a median cyst of the prostate (indicating a need for cyst aspiration), or an impairment of the seminal vesicles to become enlarged or emptied.

Hyposmotic test
To check if the plasma membrane of the sperm is working properly or if it is damaged. To do this, the spermatozoa are placed in a hypotonic medium (low in salts), which causes an osmotic imbalance in the cells, causing the medium to enter the interior of the spermatozoon and swell it.
If the sperm membrane is damaged, it will not be functional, so fertilization cannot take place. Hence the relevance of this test.

Sperm FISH
To check if the spermatozoa have a normal set of chromosomes. It provides great information about the seminal quality of the male. It is performed by marking specific chromosomes of the sperm with fluorescent DNA probes.
Some situations in which sperm FISH is indicated are the following:

-Alterations in the karyotype.
-Altered seminogram, especially in cases with low concentration or serious morphology problems.
-Man undergoing chemotherapy or radiotherapy.
-Couples with recurrent miscarriages of unknown cause.
-Implantation failure on repeated occasions after applying assisted reproductive techniques.
-Couples who have had a child with some chromosomal alteration.
Advanced age.

Prevention
Some strategies suggested or proposed for avoiding male infertility include the following:
 Avoiding smoking as it damages sperm DNA
 Avoiding heavy marijuana and alcohol use.
 Avoiding excessive heat to the testes.
 Maintaining optimal frequency of coital activity: sperm counts can be depressed by daily coital activity and sperm motility may be depressed by coital activity that takes place too infrequently (abstinence 10–14 days or more).
 Wearing a protective cup and jockstrap to protect the testicles, in any sport such as baseball, football, cricket, lacrosse, hockey, softball, paintball, rodeo, motorcross, wrestling, soccer, karate or other martial arts or any sport where a ball, foot, arm, knee or bat can come into contact with the groin.
 Diet: Healthy diets (i.e. the Mediterranean diet) rich in such nutrients as omega-3 fatty acids, some antioxidants and vitamins, and low in saturated fatty acids (SFAs) and trans-fatty acids (TFAs) are inversely associated with low semen quality parameters. In terms of food groups, fish, shellfish and seafood, poultry, cereals, vegetables and fruits, and low-fat dairy products have been positively related to sperm quality. However, diets rich in processed meat, soy foods, potatoes, full-fat dairy products, coffee, alcohol and sugar-sweetened beverages and sweets have been inversely associated with the quality of semen in some studies. The few studies relating male nutrient or food intake and fecundability also suggest that diets rich in red meat, processed meat, tea and caffeine are associated with a lower rate of fecundability. This association is only controversial in the case of alcohol. The potential biological mechanisms linking diet with sperm function and fertility are largely unknown and require further study.

Treatment
Treatments vary according to the underlying disease and the degree of the impairment of the male's fertility. Further, in an infertility situation, the fertility of the female needs to be considered.

Pre-testicular conditions can often be addressed by medical means or interventions.

Testicular-based male infertility tends to be resistant to medication. Usual approaches include using the sperm for intrauterine insemination (IUI), in vitro fertilization (IVF), or IVF with intracytoplasmatic sperm injection (ICSI). With IVF-ICSI even with a few sperm pregnancies can be achieved.

Obstructive causes of post-testicular infertility can be overcome with either surgery or IVF-ICSI. Ejaculatory factors may be treatable by medication, or by IUI therapy or IVF.

Vitamin E helps counter oxidative stress, which is associated with sperm DNA damage and reduced sperm motility. A hormone-antioxidant combination may improve sperm count and motility. Giving oral antioxidants to men in couples undergoing in vitro fertilisation for male factor or unexplained subfertility may lead to an increase in the live birth rate but overall the risk of adverse effects is unclear.

Hormonal therapy

Administration of luteinizing hormone (LH) (or human chorionic gonadotropin) and follicle-stimulating hormone (FSH) is very effective in the treatment of male infertility due to hypogonadotropic hypogonadism. Although controversial, off-label clomiphene citrate, an antiestrogen, may also be effective by elevating gonadotropin levels.

Though androgens are absolutely essential for spermatogenesis and therefore male fertility, exogenous testosterone therapy has been found to be ineffective in benefiting men with low sperm count. This is thought to be because very high local levels of testosterone in the testes (concentrations in the seminiferous tubules are 20- to 100-fold greater than circulating levels) are required to mediate spermatogenesis, and exogenous testosterone therapy (which is administered systemically) cannot achieve these required high local concentrations (at least not without extremely supraphysiological dosages). Moreover, exogenous androgen therapy can actually impair or abolish male fertility by suppressing gonadotropin secretion from the pituitary gland, as seen in users of androgens/anabolic steroids (who often have partially or completely suppressed sperm production). This is because suppression of gonadotropin levels results in decreased testicular androgen production (causing diminished local concentrations in the testes) and because FSH is independently critical for spermatogenesis. In contrast to FSH, LH has little role in male fertility outside of inducing gonadal testosterone production.

Estrogen, at some concentration, has been found to be essential for male fertility/spermatogenesis. However, estrogen levels that are too high can impair male fertility by suppressing gonadotropin secretion and thereby diminishing intratesticular androgen levels. As such, clomiphene citrate (an antiestrogen) and aromatase inhibitors such as testolactone or anastrozole have shown effectiveness in benefiting spermatogenesis.

Low-dose estrogen and testosterone combination therapy may improve sperm count and motility in some men, including in men with severe oligospermia.

Research

Researchers at Münster University developed in vitro culture conditions using a three-dimensional agar culture system which induces mouse testicular germ cells to reach the final stages of spermatogenesis, including spermatozoa generation. If reproduced in humans, this could potentially enable infertile men to father children with their own sperm.

Researchers from Montana State University developed precursors of sperm from skin cells of infertile men.

Sharpe et al. comment on the success of intracytoplasmic sperm injection (ICSI) in women saying, "[t]hus, the woman carries the treatment burden for male infertility, a fairly unique scenario in medical practice. Ironically, ICSI's success has effectively diverted attention from identifying what causes male infertility and focused research onto the female, to optimize the provision of eggs and a receptive endometrium, on which ICSI's success depends."

Prevalence 
Currently, there are no solid numbers on how many couples worldwide experience infertility, but the World Health Organization estimates between 60 and 80 million couples are affected. The population in different regions have varying amounts of infertility.

Starting in the late 20th century, scientists have expressed concerns about the declining semen quality in men. A study was done in 1992 with men who had never experienced infertility showed that the amount of sperm in semen had declined by 1% per year since 1938. Further research a few years later also confirmed the decline in sperm count and also seminal volume. Various studies in Finland, Southern Tunisia, and Argentina also showed a decline in sperm count, motility, morphology, and seminal volume.

Males from India had a 30.3% decline in sperm count, 22.9% decline in sperm motility, and a 51% decrease in morphology over a span of a decade. Doctors in India disclosed that the sperm count of a fertile Indian male had decreased by a third over a span of three decades. Some factors may include exposure to high temperatures at places such as factories. A 1 degree increase in temperature will reduce 14% of spermatogenesis.

Researchers in Calcutta conducted a study between 1981 and 1985 that also showed a decrease in sperm motility and seminal volume, but no change in sperm concentration.

Society and culture 
There are a variety of social stigmas that surround male infertility throughout the world. A lot of research has pointed to the relationship between infertility and emasculation. This association has led to infertility being less studied and diagnosed in men over time. In places like Egypt, Zimbabwe, and Mexico, erectile dysfunction also known as impotence, is considered a determinant of infertility. When stereotypical ideals of manhood are virility and strength, men sharing problems of infertility can face feelings of inadequacy, unworthiness, and have thoughts of suicide. In many cases, a variety of socio-economic interventions come in play to determine penile activity. For the Shona people, since impotence is linked to infertility, an examination to check on the penile function spans from infancy to post marriage.  At infancy, there are daily check-ups by the mothers on the son's erection and urine quality. When the son reaches puberty, they are asked to ejaculate in river banks and for their male elders to examine sperm quality. The traditions last until post-marriage, when the family of the bride take part to check on consummation and the groom's sperm quality.

Crisis

See also
 Female infertility
 Fertility preservation
 Fertility testing
 Infertility
 Male accessory gland infection (MAGI)
 Meiosis
 Oncofertility
 Paternal age effect
 Spermatogenesis
 Vasectomy

References

External links 

 
Fertility medicine
Fertility
Male genital disorders